The Northern Barrage was the name given to minefields laid by the British during World War II to restrict German access to the Atlantic Ocean. The barrage stretched from the Orkney to the Faroe Islands and on toward Iceland. Mines were also laid in the Denmark Strait, north of Iceland.

Concept
The objective of a defensive minefield is to restrict movement of enemy ships into areas used by friendly shipping. The assumed presence of a minefield may have a morale effect of assumed risk in addition to actually damaging ships attempting to cross the field. In July 1939, before World War II had begun, the possibility of a Northern Barrage between the Orkney Islands and Norway (similar to the North Sea Mine Barrage of World War I) had been considered. Other alternatives were investigated after the occupation of Norway by the Germans in April 1940.

Conventional mines of the era employed a contact-fuzed explosive charge within a buoyant shell suspended over an anchor attached by a wire rope. Use of such mines against surface ships required the mine to be suspended at a depth no greater than the ship's draft. The ability of a submarine to submerge under that depth would require layers of contact-fuzed mines at differing depths to afford equal probability of destruction. The World War I mine barrage had reduced the number of mines required by using a copper wire antenna with a float to extend it above the mine.  A ship's steel hull touching the copper antenna would form a battery and seawater acted as an electrolyte completing a circuit with an insulated copper plate on the mine surface to actuate a detonating relay within the mine.

American Mk 6 mines had been used for the deeper water portions of the World War I mine barrage. The Royal Navy standard Mk XVII mine inventory available for use at the outbreak of World War II lacked an antenna fuze. Those depth capabilities suggested the possibility of laying mines along the Iceland–Faeroes Ridge, a submerged mountain range between Iceland and the Faeroe Islands which separates the deeper portions of the Norwegian Sea to the north and the Atlantic Ocean to the south. Mk XVII mines would be laid in the shallower areas while the antenna-fuzed Mk XX mine was under development. Gaps were planned to allow passage of the fleet and convoys.

Navigation
Maintaining precise records of minefield locations is an important element of defensive minefields, since these minefields are often close to waters traditionally used by friendly shipping. Most defensive minefields had historically been within visual distance of navigational aids establishing precise locations. Laying the Northern Barrage in waters so far from land was a challenging navigational problem before Global Positioning System information was available. Much of the preparatory survey work was completed by the survey vessel . Scott later operated with the minelayers placing the deep water minefields from the spring of 1942 until minelaying was discontinued in the autumn of 1943. Scott helped establish the boundaries of previously laid adjacent minefields so the minelayers could minimize un-mined gaps without accidentally straying into previously mined areas.

Laying the barrage
The first Minelaying Squadron, based at Kyle of Lochalsh (code-named port ZA for secrecy), was formed in June 1940. Lack of escorts and support problems also restricted operations until Town-class destroyers from the Destroyers for Bases Agreement became available. The first minelaying mission left port ZA on 18 October 1940, and 10,300 conventional contact mines were laid at the southern end of the Iceland–Faeroes Ridge before the end of the year.

Minelaying progressed with new fields laid north and south of the Faeroes and in the Denmark Strait using Mk XX mines wherever its  depth coverage would reduce the number of mines required. Additional safety measures were required for the new mines after Menestheus was damaged by detonation of a drifting Mk XX mine on 6 February 1941. Intelligence reports in July indicated that U-boats were using the Faeroes–Iceland passage, so a series of deep anti-submarine fields were laid north-west of the Faeroes. A refitting programme in U.S. ports was implemented in 1941, but work was delayed by fog and gales.

1942 minelaying used a new Mk XXII mine with a buoyant copper tube upper antenna replacing the solid copper wire and buoyant float of the Mk XX mines. The minelaying cruiser  laid the first M Mk I moored magnetic mines and became a regular participant in first Minelaying Squadron missions from May through November 1942. Portions of the Denmark Strait minefield damaged by ice were relaid with M Mk I moored magnetic mines.

{| class="wikitable sortable"
|-
! Date !! Operation !! Location !! Minelayers
|-
|October 1940||SN3||Iceland-Faeroes Ridge||,  and 
|-
|November 1940||SN11||southern Iceland-Faeroes Ridge||Agamemnon, Menestheus, and Port Quebec;Port Napier exploded before leaving port ZA
|-
|December 1940||SN10A||southern Iceland-Faeroes Ridge||Agamemnon and Menestheus
|-
|January 1941||SN6||south of Faeroes||Agamemnon, Menestheus, Port Quebec and Southern Prince
|-
|January 1941||SN65||south of Faeroes||Agamemnon, Menestheus, Port Quebec and Southern Prince
|-
|February 1941||SN7A||||Port Quebec and Southern Prince;Menestheus damaged by a drifting Mk XX mine and towed back to port ZA by Agamemnon
|-
|February 1941||SN7B & SN68A||||Agamemnon, Port Quebec and Southern Prince
|-
|-
|April 1941||SN71||Denmark Strait||Menestheus, Port Quebec and Southern Prince|-
|April 1941||SN8||Denmark Strait||Agamemnon, Menestheus, Port Quebec and Southern Prince|-
|May 1941||SN9||Iceland-Faeroes Ridge||Agamemnon, Menestheus and Port Quebec|-
|June 1941||SN64||North Rona area||Agamemnon and Menestheus|-
|June 1941||SN66||||Agamemnon and Menestheus|-
|June 1941||SN70B||Iceland-Faeroes Ridge||Agamemnon and Menestheus;collision between escorts  and 
|-
|July 1941||SN67A||Iceland-Faeroes Ridge||Agamemnon, Menestheus and Port Quebec|-
|July 1941||SN12A||northwest of Sula Sgeir||
|-
|August 1941||SN22B||Butt of Lewis||Agamemnon|-
|August 1941||SN70A||Butt of Lewis||Menestheus, Port Quebec and Southern Prince;Southern Prince torpedoed by U-652 on return trip
|-
|September 1941||SN61||North Rona area||Agamemnon|-
|September 1941||SN23||Butt of Lewis||Port Quebec|-
|October 1941||SN24||Butt of Lewis||Port Quebec|-
|October 1941||SN83A||northern Faeroes gap||, Menestheus and Port Quebec|-
|November 1941||SN83B||northern Faeroes gap||Menestheus and Port Quebec|-
|November 1941||SN25||northwest approaches||Menestheus|-
|January 1942||SN26||Butt of Lewis||Agamemnon|-
|February 1942||SN5B||Faeroes fjords||Agamemnon and Menestheus|-
|February 1942||SN84||Iceland-Faeroes Ridge||Agamemnon, Menestheusand Port Quebec|-
|February 1942||SN85||Iceland-Faeroes Ridge||Agamemnon, Menestheus, Port Quebec and Southern Prince|-
|March 1942||SN81||Iceland-Faeroes Ridge||Agamemnon, Menestheus, Port Quebec and Southern Prince|-
|March 1942||SN87||Iceland-Faeroes Ridge||Agamemnon, Menestheus, Port Quebec and Southern Prince|-
|April 1942||SN88||Iceland-Faeroes Ridge||Agamemnon, Menestheus, Port Quebec and Southern Prince|-
|May 1942||SN3A||Faeroes shelf west of Orkney Islands||, Agamemnon, Menestheus, Port Quebec and Southern Prince|-
|June 1942||SN72||Denmark Strait||Adventure, Agamemnon, Menestheus, Port Quebec and Southern Prince|-
|June 1942||SN3B||Faeroes shelf west of Orkney Islands||Adventure, Agamemnon, Menestheus, Port Quebec and Southern Prince|-
|July 1942||SN3C||Faeroes shelf west of Orkney Islands||Adventure, Agamemnon, Menestheus, Port Quebec and Southern Prince|-
|July 1942||SN82||Iceland-Faeroes Ridge||Adventure, Agamemnon, Menestheus, Port Quebec and Southern Prince|-
|August 1942||SN73||Denmark Strait||Adventure, Agamemnon, Menestheus, Port Quebec and Southern Prince|-
|September 1942||SN89||Iceland-Faeroes Ridge||Adventure, Agamemnon, Menestheus, Port Quebec and Southern Prince|-
|September 1942||SN65A||Iceland-Faeroes Ridge||Adventure, Agamemnon, Menestheus, Port Quebec and Southern Prince|-
|October 1942||SN3E||Faeroes shelf west of Orkney Islands||Adventure, Agamemnon, Menestheus, Port Quebec and Southern Prince|-
|November 1942||SN3F||Faeroes shelf west of Orkney Islands||Adventure, Agamemnon, Menestheus, Port Quebec and Southern Prince|-
|March 1943||SN90A||west of Iceland||Agamemnon, Menestheus and Port Quebec|-
|May 1943||SN111A||off Iceland||Agamemnon, Menestheus and Port Quebec|-
|May 1943||SN123A||Butt of Lewis||Agamemnon lays experimental field of modified M Mark I Mines
|-
|May 1943||SN123B||Butt of Lewis||Agamemnon, Menestheus and Port Quebec lay experimental field
|-
|June 1943||SN123C||Butt of Lewis||Agamemnon, Menestheus and Port Quebec lay experimental field
|-
|June 1943||SN222A||southeast of Iceland||Agamemnon, Menestheus and Port Quebec|-
|August 1943||SN74||Denmark Strait||Agamemnon, Menestheus and Port Quebec|-
|September 1943||SN222B||southeast of Iceland||Agamemnon, Menestheus and Port Quebec|-
|September 1943||SN222C||southeast of Iceland||Agamemnon, Menestheus and Port Quebec|-
|}

In fog on 5 July 1942  mistook an iceberg for Iceland’s North Western Cape and led six merchant ships of Murmansk to Reykjavík convoy QP 13 into minefield SN72 laid one month earlier at the entrance to the Denmark Strait. Every ship struck mines. There were no crewmen lost aboard the Soviet freighter Rodina (4441 GRT), the Panamanian-flagged freighter Exterminator (6115 GRT), or the American freighter Hybert (6120 GRT); but 46 civilian crew and 9 Naval Armed Guards died aboard the American Liberty ship John Randolph (7191 GRT) and freighters Hefron (7611 GRT) and Massmar (5825 GRT); and there were only eight survivors of the 127 men aboard Niger. Only Exterminator could be salvaged. The value of the Northern Barrage was questioned following the accident, though new fields were laid south of Iceland, before starting new deep fields on the Faeroes shelf.

Cancelled

The future of the Northern Barrage was discussed by the Admiralty at meetings in January and July 1943. The barrage had proved difficult to maintain and had already required over 80,000 mines. The work had also diverted badly needed ships from fleet and convoy defence to provide escorts for the minelayers. The Allies were unaware of these U-boat losses and attributed most of them to Allied ship and aircraft attacks after the Commander-in-Chief of the Home Fleet declared the Northern Barrage "the least profitable voluntary major undertaking of the war"''.

The programme was cancelled and apart from the laying of an additional field at the entrance to the Denmark Strait, the only minelaying approved was a series of deep fields at the northern end of the Faeroes–Iceland gap. On completion of the programme the first Minelaying Squadron was disbanded; 92,083 mines had been laid, representing 35 per cent of all British minelaying efforts but the passage of U-boats had hardly been affected. The Northern Barrage had failed to justify its existence and had often been more dangerous to Allied forces than to the Germans. Afterwards more effort was deployed on offensive minelaying by submarines, motor launches and aircraft, which proved far more effective.

Legacy
Not all of the mines were removed or destroyed during or following the war and unexploded mines have been discovered into the twenty-first century. Most of the steel shell has corroded  unless protected by burial in anaerobic sediment; but the cast explosive charge may still be intact. TNT was the most commonly used explosive, although it was sometimes mixed with ammonium nitrate (forming Amatol) for economy and with powdered aluminum (forming Minol) to increase underwater damage.

References

External links
 British Minelaying 1940 (video)

Naval battles and operations of World War II involving the United Kingdom
Naval mines
North Sea operations of World War II